Doctor in the House is a comic novel by Richard Gordon, published in 1952. Set in the fictitious St. Swithin's Hospital in London, the story concerns the exploits and various pranks of a young medical student. It is the first of a series of 'Doctor' novels written by Gordon, himself a surgeon and anaesthetist. The main character is also named Richard Gordon, although after the first few books he is renamed Simon Sparrow, which name is also used in the screen and radio adaptations. (The television series would use entirely different characters.)

A film adaptation, Doctor in the House, was released in 1954, starring Dirk Bogarde; several of the subsequent books were also filmed. There were a number of TV series very loosely based on the books, and a 13-part radio series on the BBC in 1968 starring Richard Briers as Simon.

References 

http://catalogue.bl.uk/
http://www.thereadingroom.com/books/details/doctor-in-the-house-richard-gordon/90076

1952 British novels
British comedy novels
British novels adapted into films
Doctor in the House
1952 debut novels
Michael Joseph books
Novels by Richard Gordon